is a 1995 Japanese film directed by Takashi Miike. The film is one of the earliest examples of Miike's use of extreme violence and unusual characterization, two aspects he would become notorious for. The film is part of the Black Society trilogy and is followed by Rainy Dog and Ley Lines.

Plot
The film recounts the interactions of the Dragon's Claw triad society and its homosexual leader Wang Zhi-Ming with a renegade police officer named Tatushito as well as opposing yakuza organizations. When Tatsuhito's younger brother Yoshihito becomes the lawyer to the triad society, an argument between the two brothers leads to the downfall of the organization.

Cast

Release
Shinjuku Triad Society was released in Japan on 26 August 1995.

Reception
Sight & Sound noted the film was similar to the gangster films of Kinji Fukasaku, while noting that "scenes such as the one where sodomy is used as a police interrogation technique bear Miike's unmistakable signature." Time Out London stated that "Even viewers hardened to the perversities which tend to crop up in Japanese exploitation genres may find themselves rubbing their eyes at some of the images and incidents in Miike's extremist thriller" and that "Miike's stylish, gleeful direction establishes him as the most distinctive new 'voice' in the genre since Rokuro Mochizuki."

References

Footnotes

Sources

External links
 

1995 films
1990s Japanese-language films
Yakuza films
Triad films
Films about brothers
Gay-related films
Films about organ trafficking
Films about police officers
Films directed by Takashi Miike
Films set in Taipei
Films set in Tokyo
Japanese LGBT-related films
1995 LGBT-related films
1990s Japanese films
1990s Hong Kong films